Antoine Charles IV de Gramont, comte de Guiche, 3rd Duke de Gramont, comte de Louvigny, Souverain de Bidache (1641 – 25 October 1720) was a French diplomat.

Early life
He was the youngest son of Antoine III de Gramont and Françoise-Marguerite du Plessis de Chivré (d. 2 May 1689), Cardinal Richelieu's niece.

Biography
He distinguished himself in the King’s armies during the campaign against Holland in 1672 and during the Siege of Besançon (1674) in the Franco-Dutch War.
Later he was Ambassador extraordinary in Spain, Viceroy of Navarre and Béarn, and governor of Bayonne. 
He was a Knight of the King's order and Knight of the Golden Fleece.

Personal life
In 1668 he married Marie Charlotte de Castelnau (1648 – 29 January 1694), daughter of Marshal Castelnau.
They had two children :
Catherine-Charlotte de Boufflers (c. 1670–1739), lady-in-waiting, married Louis François, duc de Boufflers
Antoine V de Gramont (1672–1725), 4th Duke of Gramont.

After his wife died, he married Anne Baillet de La Cour (1665-1737) in 1710.
They had one child:
 NN de Gramont (b. 1704 - d. before 1720)

Ancestors

See also
Gramont

External links 
 

Gramont, Antoine IV de
Gramont, Antoine IV de
Antoine 4
Counts of Guiche
Counts of Gramont
Counts of Louvigny
Gramont, Antoine IV de
Knights of the Golden Fleece of Spain
17th-century peers of France
18th-century peers of France